Automobil und Aviatik AG was a German aircraft manufacturer during World War I. The company was established at Mülhausen (today in France) in 1909 and soon became one of the country's leading producers of aircraft.  It relocated to Freiburg in 1914 and to Leipzig in 1916 and established a subsidiary in Vienna as Österreichisch-Ungarische Flugzeugfabrik Aviatik. During the war, the company became best known for its reconnaissance aircraft, the B.I and B.II, although the Austro-Hungarian subsidiary also produced a number of its own designs, including fighters such as the D.I.

History
The company was founded in December 1909 by the Alsatian Georges Chatel. It started with the license-production of French aircraft; Hanriot monoplanes and Farman biplanes. From 1912, the factory started building its own successful biplanes, designed by Robert Wild.

Just at the beginning of World War One, on 1 August 1914 the company was relocated to Freiburg due to French threat, and then to new facilities in Leipzig-Heiterblick in 1916. The company did not continue after the 1919 Treaty of Versailles.

Aircraft

Aviatik B.I
Aviatik B.II
Aviatik B.III
Aviatik C.I
Aviatik C.II
Aviatik C.III
Aviatik C.V
Aviatik (Ö) C.I
Aviatik (Berg) D.I
Aviatik (Berg) D.II
Aviatik D.III
Aviatik D.VII

See also
List of aircraft manufacturers

References

 

Defunct aircraft manufacturers of Germany
Manufacturing companies established in 1909
1909 establishments in Germany
1919 disestablishments in Germany
Manufacturing companies disestablished in 1919